Bize-Minervois is a commune in the Aude department in southern France.

Geography
Located on the edge of the Haut-Minervois in the Cesse valley, Bize lies between the fertile sedimentary plain of Narbonne and the causses of the Minervois and the Montagne Noire. Bize is situated approximately 3 km north of the D5 between Olonzac and Capestang. Bize is a small village with a population approximately 1,000 where a quarter of the houses are  second homes.

History
Bize is first mentioned in 911 in the will of man named Walcharius who left the lands of the parish of Saint-Saturnin of Bizan to the Archbishop of Narbonne. During the religious wars of the 16th century Bize changed hands many times and in 1573 was fortified as a protestant stronghold against the catholic Bishops of Narbonne.

Population

Sights
Caves Las Fonts (Moulin) - Paleolithic caves, now a classified monument where prehistoric remains were discovered in 1827 by French archaeologist and scientist Paul Tournal, founder of the Narbonne Museum.
La Porte Saint Michel 1236 - the main gate in to the village coming from the direction of Narbonne. A second gate, La Porte St Croix - the entrance from the direction Argeliers, Minerve and Saint-Pons - was demolished in the 19th century to allow easier passage for carts.
The church of Saint-Michel (18th century)

Events
 'Fete d l'olivier' - Festival of Olives is held annually in July
 General market every Wednesday morning throughout the year

Amenities
Bize has two bakers, two general stores, a post office, hairdressers, a pharmacy, and a wine cave. There is also a bar and several restaurants.
Sporting facilities include a boulodrome, football pitches (home of Bize FC), tennis courts and in the summer the Cesse is dammed to create a freshwater swimming hole.

See also
Communes of the Aude department

References

External links

The official website of Bize-Minervois 

Communes of Aude